Buc-ee's is a chain of country stores, gas stations, and Tesla Superchargers created and owned by Arch "Beaver" Aplin III, headquartered in Lake Jackson, Texas The chain was first founded in 1982 in Clute, Texas and began expansion with its first travel center in Luling, Texas in 2001. The company began expanding outside of Texas in 2018 with the opening of a location in Baldwin County, Alabama, and has since opened locations in Georgia, Florida, Kentucky, South Carolina, and Tennessee, with new locations planned for Colorado, Louisiana, Mississippi, Missouri, Virginia, and Wisconsin.

The chain is well known for the large size of its locations, alongside its product offerings of fuel, snacks (particularly beef jerky and candy), brisket, baked goods and commodities, tacos, fresh sandwiches, souvenirs, and travel items. The chain has also become well known for the cleanliness of its bathrooms, mascot, and the company's prohibition of 18-wheelers at their locations.

The chain has since developed a highly loyal customer base and often ranks among the most favorited gas station in the country. Its bathrooms has also gained significant acclaim, winning the Cintas award for "Best Restroom in America" in 2012.

History
Founder Arch "Beaver" Aplin opened his first store as partners in Clute, Texas in 1982 (it is still open). Aplin formed the name Buc-ee's by combining his childhood nickname; the name of his Labrador Retriever, Buck; as well as the appeal of Ipana toothpaste's animated mascot, Bucky the beaver. Aplin was born in Southeast Texas, with his father originating from, and grandparents residing in, Harrisonburg, Louisiana.

Buc-ee's expanded and opened its first travel center in Luling, Texas, in 2001

In 2012, Buc-ee's opened its largest travel center in New Braunfels, Texas, on Interstate 35. The store features 120 fueling positions, 1,000 parking spots, 64 ice freezers, 83 toilets, 31 cash registers, four Icee machines, and 80 fountain dispensers. It also offers tubing and water gear for enjoying the nearby Guadalupe River. The New Braunfels, Texas store was named the 2012 "Best Restroom in America" by Cintas.

After significant expansion in the Greater Houston area and Central Texas, the first Buc-ee's in the Dallas–Fort Worth metroplex opened in Terrell, Texas, on June 22, 2015. The travel center is located three miles west of Tanger Outlets on Interstate 20.

In September 2015, it was announced that at least part of Buc-ee's corporate operations would move to office space at Pearland Town Center. The "partial headquarters" would house legal and human resources departments of the company. The space was to be ready by the early part of 2016.

The second Buc-ee's in the Metroplex opened on May 23, 2016. The store is located in far northern Fort Worth, across the street from Texas Motor Speedway. The third DFW location opened in Denton, Texas, on October 29, 2018.

Buc-ee's broke ground on another North Texas location in Melissa, Texas, on February 5, 2018. The store is located off of New Davis Road and U.S. Highway 75. The store opened April 29, 2019.

Expansion outside Texas

On March 8, 2016, Buc-ee's announced a possible first location outside of the state of Texas would be located in Baton Rouge, Louisiana. The location was expected to open in early 2017; however, on October 4, 2016, Buc-ee's announced that the plans for the Baton Rouge location had been terminated.

On April 12, 2017, Buc-ee's announced that it would open their first convenience store/gas station outside of Texas in Daytona Beach, Florida, located on the north side of LPGA Boulevard across from Tanger Outlets, just east of Interstate 95 and immediately west of Stonewood Grill & Tavern (formerly Vince Carter's). Construction began in summer 2018. However, delays in the project pushed the construction date to sometime in 2021. Since the announcement of the Daytona Beach location, Buc-ee's also announced a new location to be built near St. Augustine, Florida. The St. Augustine location opened first on February 23, 2021, and the Daytona location opened on March 22, 2021.

In January 2018, Buc-ee's broke ground on what became its first location outside of Texas, in Baldwin County, Alabama.

And in June 2019, Buc-ee's broke ground on a second Alabama location, to be located along Interstate 20 in Leeds, not far from Barber Motorsports Park.

Buc-ee's broke ground on its first store in Georgia in Warner Robins near the interchange of Interstate 75 and Russell Parkway on November 18, 2019. Buc-ee's chose Warner Robins as the location of its first Georgia store for its central location between Atlanta and Florida, its fast population growth as well as the presence of Robins Air Force Base. The Warner Robins location opened on November 18, 2020, exactly one year to the date of ground breaking, and brought 200 jobs to the area. Buc-ee's opened a store at the World Golf Village in Northeast Florida in February 2021, bringing about 250 jobs to the area. Buc-ee's opened its second Georgia store in Calhoun at exit 310 on Interstate 75 and SR-53 (Union Grove Road) approximately halfway between Atlanta and Chattanooga, Tennessee in August 2021, filling 175 jobs.

In July 2020, Buc-ee's announced plans to build its first store in Kentucky. The store is located in Richmond on Interstate 75, opened to the public on April 19, 2022. The store is the farthest north for the chain to date.

In February 2021, Buc-ee's abandoned a planned expansion into North Carolina in Orange County. Locals in the community of Efland, where the convenience store chain planned to build, cited environmental concerns such as increased traffic congestion and potential pollution of a nearby protected watershed as their reason for opposing Buc-ee's.

In June 2021, Buc-ee's announced plans to break ground on June 15 for a new travel center located at 2045 Genesis Road off of Interstate 40 in Crossville, Tennessee. This would mark the first Buc-ee's location in the state of Tennessee. The location, Buc-ee's Crossville, opened on June 27, 2022.

In January 2022, they announced that a new location will open in Springfield, Missouri, in 2023 off  Interstate 44.

On May 16, 2022, the first Buc-ee's in South Carolina opened.  It is located at the intersection of Interstate 95 and State Route 327 in Florence.

On March 6, 2023, Buc-ee's announced plans to build the first Virginia location in New Kent County near Exit 211 off Interstate 64.

Locations 
As of March 2023, Buc-ee's has 44 active locations across Alabama, Florida, Georgia, Kentucky, South Carolina, Tennessee, and Texas.

Products and services

Food 
All travel center locations include a bakery, brisket and fudge bar, snack isle, and a soda, coffee, and Icee station. Locations also feature walls lined with a variety of candy and beef jerky flavors to purchase, including a beef jerky bar. Product offerings include cookies, kolaches, and pastries in the bakery, BBQ brisket sandwiches, breakfast tacos/sandwiches at the brisket bar, along with cold cut wraps and sandwiches. Packaged cups of fruit and vegetables can be purchased as well. Locations also house packaged general snack foods, ice cream and Dippin' Dots, water, soda, energy drinks, and alcohol. The company has produced many of its own original snack foods, the most notable of which being Beaver Nuggets, the company's best selling product. Customers can also purchase bags of ice as well.

Souvenirs and general merchandise 
Besides food and drink, the company also offers a variety of general and regional based souvenirs, including apparel, and artwork. The chain carries its own brand of clothing ranging from t-shirts to hats, pants, plushies, swimwear, and blankets. Stores also carry general kitchen goods, including cast iron skillets, food containers, mugs, glassware, cookbooks, coolers, and thermoses, among others. General travel products are sold as well, along with phone accessories. A variety of locations also sell hunting gear and equipment, alongside outdoor products such as grills and firepits.

Fuel 
All Buc-ee's travel centers include 80-120 gas pumps, with fuel offerings ranging from unleaded to diesel. Some stores include Ethanol Free and DEF fuel as well.

Tesla Superchargers 
In November 2021 it was reported that Tesla would be opening Superchargers at 26 Buc-ee's locations in 7 states. As of February 2023 there were operational Superchargers at more than half of the planned locations including In Alabama (Leeds, Robertson); Florida (St. Augustine); Tennessee (Crossville); South Carolina (Florence); and Texas (Baytown, Bastrop, Ennis, Giddings, Katy, New Braunfels, Madisonville, Melissa, and Wharton).

Car washes 
As of February 2023, Buc-ee's has car washes available at 5 of their locations, all within the state of Texas. The longest of which, located in Katy Texas, holds the record for the longest car wash in the world at 255 feet of conveyor.

Lawsuits
In recent years, during the company's rapidly growing success, Buc-ee's has filed numerous lawsuits against other convenience store chains, most of them based in Texas, for trademark and trade dress infringement.

In 2014, Buc-ee's filed a lawsuit against Texas based convenience store chain "Frio Beaver". Frio Beaver, a company with a logo also depicting a beaver in a yellow circle with a black outline, was accused of copying the iconic Buc-ee's beaver head logo, which the company is widely known for in Texas.  The case was settled out of court in December  2014: B&B Grocery Inc. agreed to stop using the "Frio Beaver" logo and mascot.

In 2016, Buc-ee's sued "Choke Canyon BBQ", another Texas convenience store, for copyright infringement and trade dressing. Choke Canyon uses a logo of a grinning alligator in the middle of a yellow circle, which Buc-ee's claims is an attempt by the chain to resemble the Buc-ee's logo. Choke Canyon is also calling their new stores "Bucky's". Choke Canyon lost the federal lawsuit in May 2018 with Choke Canyon changing their logo to a cowboy inside of an orange circle.

In 2017, Buc-ee's again filed a lawsuit for breaking an agreement, this time against a Nebraska-based convenience store chain known as "Bucky's". The two companies had agreed to remain in their respective states and expand only to states where the other did not operate.

There was also a non-logo related lawsuit filed in 2013 against "Chicks", a convenience store located in Bryan, Texas, for trade dressing by allegedly copying Buc-ee's mega convenience store designs and layout. The case was settled out of court.

Buc-ee's also lost a Texas Employee Retention Agreement case on an appeal in 2017. A year after a trial court ordered a former employee to pay Buc-ee's close to $100,000 in damages and attorney's fees for breaching a "Retention Agreement," a Texas court of appeals reversed the decision and ordered that Buc-ee's take nothing on its claims against the former employee. The court reasoned that the contract violated Texas' employment-at-will doctrine. It could only be valid if it met the requirements of an actual non-compete agreement, but as this did not meet Texas' requirement for non-compete, the contract was not enforceable.

References

Further reading

External links

 

Retail companies established in 1982
Companies based in Texas
Brazoria County, Texas
1982 establishments in Texas
Convenience stores of the United States
Gas stations in the United States
Economy of the Southern United States
Texas culture